John Latham (21 July 1937 – 27 April 2021) was a British physicist and professor emeritus at the University of Manchester, known for his work on atmospheric electricity and, later in his career, climate engineering.

Latham obtained a PhD on thunderstorm electrification from Imperial College London, where he was supervised by John Mason. In 1961, he moved to Umist, now part of Manchester University, to take up a lectureship and founded the Atmospheric Physics research group. In 1988, he was hired as a senior research associate in ESSL/MMM at the National Center for Atmospheric Research (NCAR) in Colorado.

Latham is most known for his work on thunderstorm electrification and marine cloud brightening, a form of geoengineering which relies on seawater sprayed from ships. In collaboration with Stephen Salter he developed a scheme involving Flettner vessels.

He supervised over 25 doctoral students, the first of whom was David Stow.

Latham was also a talented writer. He published six collections of poetry and had radio plays broadcast on BBC Radio 4.

References

1937 births
2021 deaths
British physicists
British climatologists
British poets
Alumni of Imperial College London
Academics of the University of Manchester
People from Frodsham